Last Gang Records is a record label formed by Canadian music industry lawyer Chris Taylor and concert promoter Donald K. Tarlton in the Fall of 2003 at the Pop Montreal Music Festival. Last Gang was nominated as Independent Record Label of the Year at the Canadian Music Awards in 2006.

It was acquired by Entertainment One in March 2016, with Taylor being appointed the new president of eOne Music, now MNRK Music Group.

Last Gang Publishing 
Founded in 2006, Last Gang Publishing is a music publishing company with primary operations based in Toronto and Los Angeles. 

Last Gang Publishing represents both external clients, such as Dubmatix, Egyptrixx, and Hiawatha, and internal Last Gang Records recording artists, such as Mother Mother, Silver Starling, and O'Luge.

Artists 
Last Gang Records has released albums by:

Gold & Platinum Certifications
Metric Old World Underground, Where Are You Now?

Death From Above 1979 You're A Woman, I'm A Machine

Metric Live It Out

Metric Fantasies

Awards and nominations

Juno Awards

|-
|  || A.C. Newman The Slow Wonder || Alternative Album Of The Year || 
|-
|  || Death From Above 1979 || New Group Of The Year || 
|-
|  || Death From Above 1979 You're A Woman, I'm A Machine || CD/DVD Artwork Of The Year || 
|-
|  || Metric Live It Out || Alternative Album Of The Year || 
|-
|  || Tiga Sexor || Dance Recording Of The Year || 
|-
|  || MSTRKRFT The Looks || CD/DVD Artwork Of The Year || 
|-
|  || Chromeo Fancy Footwork || Dance Recording Of The Year || 
|-
|  || Crystal Castles || New Group Of The Year || 
|-
|  || Metric Fantasies || Alternative Album Of The Year || 
|-
|  || Metric  || Group Of The Year || 
|-
|  || Emily Haines & Jimmy Shaw for "Gimme Sympathy", "Sick Muse", "Help I'm Alive" from Fantasies || Songwriter Of The Year || 
|-
|  || Chromeo Business Casual || Dance Recording Of The Year || 
|-
|  || Crystal Castles (II) || Electronic Album Of The Year || 
|-
|  || Lindi Ortega  || New Artist Of The Year || 
|-
|  || Lindi Ortega Little Red Boots || Roots & Traditional Of The Year (Solo) || 
|-
|  || Mother Mother || New Group Of The Year || 
|-
|  || Mother Mother The Stand (dir. John JP Poliquin) || Video Of The Year || 
|-
|  || Crystal Castles (III) || Electronic Album Of The Year || 
|-
|  || Purity Ring Shrines || Electronic Album Of The Year || 
|-
|  || Ryan Hemsworth Guilt Trips || Electronic Album Of The Year || 
|-

Polaris Music Prize
The Polaris Music Prize is awarded annually to the best full-length Canadian album based on artistic merit. Last Gang Records has had three albums make the short list, and 11 nominations on the long list.

|-
|  || Metric Live It Out || Polaris Music Prize || 
|-
|  || Metric Fantasies || Polaris Music Prize || 
|-
|  || Purity Ring Shrines || Polaris Music Prize ||

See also
 List of record labels

External links
Last Gang Entertainment

References

Canadian independent record labels
MNRK Music Group
Indie rock record labels
Record labels established in 2003